Raúl González III (born 23 September 1994) is a Puerto Rican footballer who plays for USL Championship club Memphis 901 FC and the Puerto Rico national team. He is usually employed as a central or attacking midfielder.

Youth and college career
From 2007 to 2011, González played youth soccer for Gulf Coast United's development program.  In 2012 to 2013, he played at as a forward/midfielder for the U-18 IMG Academy. He also played four years of high school soccer for Ocean Springs High School. In addition, he was a varsity letter-winner for track, football and baseball.

Club career
Between his junior and senior years of college, González played in seven matches for the Premier Development League side, Des Moines Menace. He made seven appearances and tallied one goal for the Menace.

On 30 March 2017, González signed a professional contract with the Richmond Kickers of the United Soccer League. He scored his first goal for the Kickers on 21 May 2017 in a 1–1 away draw at Rochester Rhinos.

González joined USL Championship expansion team Memphis 901 FC ahead of the 2019 season. Unfortunately, he sustained a season-ending knee injury during a preseason friendly match against Louisville City FC on 20 February 2019.

International career
In October 2020, it was announced that González agreed to represent Puerto Rico internationally for the upcoming 2022 FIFA World Cup qualification set to start in 2021. He made his international debut on 19 January 2021, as a starter in a 1–0 away friendly win against the Dominican Republic.

References

External links 

PDL Player Profile
Memphis Profile

1994 births
Living people
Puerto Rican footballers
Association football midfielders
Puerto Rico international footballers
American soccer players
Des Moines Menace players
Memphis 901 FC players
Memphis Tigers men's soccer players
People from Ocean Springs, Mississippi
Richmond Kickers players
Soccer players from Mississippi
USL Championship players
USL League Two players
American sportspeople of Puerto Rican descent